Hydrovatus is a genus of water beetles in the family Dytiscidae, containing the following species:

 Hydrovatus abraeoides Régimbart, 1895
 Hydrovatus absonus Guignot, 1948
 Hydrovatus acuminatus Motschulsky, 1859
 Hydrovatus agathodaemon Biström, 1997
 Hydrovatus amplicornis Régimbart, 1895
 Hydrovatus angusticornis Biström, 1997
 Hydrovatus antennatus (Peschet, 1924)
 Hydrovatus aristidis Leprieur, 1879
 Hydrovatus asemus Biström, 1997
 Hydrovatus asymmetricus Biström & Wewalka, 1994
 Hydrovatus badeni Sharp, 1882
 Hydrovatus balfourbrownei Biström, 1997
 Hydrovatus balneator Guignot, 1954
 Hydrovatus baptus Guignot, 1954
 Hydrovatus bedoanus Bruneau de Miré & Legros, 1963
 Hydrovatus bicolor Guignot, 1956
 Hydrovatus bomansi Guignot, 1955
 Hydrovatus bonvouloiri Sharp, 1882
 Hydrovatus brancuccii Biström, 1997
 Hydrovatus bredoi Gschwendtner, 1943
 Hydrovatus brevipes Sharp, 1882
 Hydrovatus brevipilis Guignot, 1942
 Hydrovatus brownei Omer-Cooper, 1955
 Hydrovatus brunneus Guignot, 1961
 Hydrovatus bullatus Guignot, 1958
 Hydrovatus capnius Guignot, 1950
 Hydrovatus caraibus Sharp, 1882
 Hydrovatus cardoni Severin, 1890
 Hydrovatus castaneus Motschulsky, 1855
 Hydrovatus cessatus Guignot, 1956
 Hydrovatus charactes Guignot, 1955
 Hydrovatus clypealis Sharp, 1876
 Hydrovatus collega Guignot, 1955
 Hydrovatus compactus Sharp, 1882
 Hydrovatus concii Bilardo & Pederzani, 1978
 Hydrovatus concolor Sharp, 1887
 Hydrovatus confertus Sharp, 1882
 Hydrovatus confossus Guignot, 1958
 Hydrovatus confusus Régimbart, 1903
 Hydrovatus contumax Guignot, 1954
 Hydrovatus coracinus Guignot, 1947
 Hydrovatus crassicornis (H.J.Kolbe, 1883)
 Hydrovatus crassulus Sharp, 1882
 Hydrovatus cribratus Sharp, 1882
 Hydrovatus cristatus Guignot, 1958
 Hydrovatus cruentatus H.J.Kolbe, 1883
 Hydrovatus cuspidatus (Kunze, 1818)
 Hydrovatus dama Guignot, 1958
 Hydrovatus davidis Young, 1956
 Hydrovatus dentatus Bilardo & Rocchi, 1990
 Hydrovatus deserticola Guignot, 1950
 Hydrovatus diabolicus Biström & Larson, 1995
 Hydrovatus difformis Régimbart, 1895
 Hydrovatus duponti Régimbart, 1895
 Hydrovatus enigmaticus Biström, 1997
 Hydrovatus eximius Biström, 1997
 Hydrovatus exochomoides Régimbart, 1895
 Hydrovatus facetus Guignot, 1942
 Hydrovatus fasciatus Sharp, 1882
 Hydrovatus felixi Biström, 1997
 Hydrovatus fernandoi Biström, 1997
 Hydrovatus ferrugineus Zimmermann, 1920
 Hydrovatus flammulatus Sharp, 1882
 Hydrovatus flebilis Guignot, 1945
 Hydrovatus fractus Sharp, 1882
 Hydrovatus frater Régimbart, 1895
 Hydrovatus fulvicollis Guignot, 1958
 Hydrovatus gabonicus Régimbart, 1895
 Hydrovatus galpini Omer-Cooper, 1957
 Hydrovatus glaber Guignot, 1953
 Hydrovatus globulosus Gschwendtner, 1943
 Hydrovatus grabowskyi Régimbart, 1899
 Hydrovatus granosus Guignot, 1958
 Hydrovatus gravis Guignot, 1954
 Hydrovatus guignoti Omer-Cooper, 1957
 Hydrovatus guignotianus Guignot, 1959
 Hydrovatus hamatus Guignot, 1950
 Hydrovatus heterogynus Zimmermann, 1926
 Hydrovatus hintoni Biström, 1997
 Hydrovatus hornii Crotch, 1873
 Hydrovatus imitator Biström, 1997
 Hydrovatus impunctatus Guignot, 1953
 Hydrovatus inexpectatus Young, 1963
 Hydrovatus insolitus Guignot, 1948
 Hydrovatus irianensis Biström, 1997
 Hydrovatus jaechi Biström, 1997
 Hydrovatus kavanaughi Biström, 1997
 Hydrovatus laosensis Biström, 1997
 Hydrovatus latipalpis Biström, 1997
 Hydrovatus leconteii (Clark, 1862)
 Hydrovatus leonardii Bilardo & Pederzani, 1978
 Hydrovatus lintrarius Guignot, 1958
 Hydrovatus longicornis Sharp, 1882
 Hydrovatus longior Biström, 1997
 Hydrovatus maai Biström, 1997
 Hydrovatus macrocephalus Gschwendtner, 1934
 Hydrovatus macrocerus Régimbart, 1895
 Hydrovatus madagascariensis Régimbart, 1903
 Hydrovatus marlieri Guignot, 1956
 Hydrovatus medialis J.Balfour-Browne, 1939
 Hydrovatus megalocerus Bilardo & Pederzani, 1978
 Hydrovatus mollis Biström, 1997
 Hydrovatus mucronatus Régimbart, 1908
 Hydrovatus mundus Omer-Cooper, 1931
 Hydrovatus naviger Biström, 1997
 Hydrovatus nefandus Omer-Cooper, 1957
 Hydrovatus nephodes Guignot, 1953
 Hydrovatus ngorekiensis Bilardo & Rocchi, 1999
 Hydrovatus niger Gschwendtner, 1938
 Hydrovatus nigricans Sharp, 1882
 Hydrovatus nigrita Sharp, 1882
 Hydrovatus nilssoni Biström, 1997
 Hydrovatus nimbaensis Guignot, 1954
 Hydrovatus niokolensis Guignot, 1956
 Hydrovatus noumeni Bilardo & Rocchi, 1990
 Hydrovatus oblongipennis Régimbart, 1895
 Hydrovatus oblongiusculus Régimbart, 1895
 Hydrovatus oblongus Omer-Cooper, 1957
 Hydrovatus obsoletus Peschet, 1922
 Hydrovatus obtusus Motschulsky, 1855
 Hydrovatus omentatus Guignot, 1950
 Hydrovatus opacus Sharp, 1882
 Hydrovatus otiosus Guignot, 1945
 Hydrovatus ovalis Sharp, 1882
 Hydrovatus parallelipennis Régimbart, 1895
 Hydrovatus parallelus Sharp, 1882
 Hydrovatus parameces Guignot, 1958
 Hydrovatus parvulus Régimbart, 1900
 Hydrovatus pederzanii Bilardo & Rocchi, 1990
 Hydrovatus peninsularis Young, 1953
 Hydrovatus perrinae Bilardo & Pederzani, 1978
 Hydrovatus perssoni Biström & Nilsson, 1997
 Hydrovatus pescheti Omer-Cooper, 1931
 Hydrovatus piceus Guignot, 1961
 Hydrovatus picipennis Motschulsky, 1859
 Hydrovatus pictulus Sharp, 1882
 Hydrovatus pilitibiis Omer-Cooper, 1957
 Hydrovatus pilula Guignot, 1954
 Hydrovatus pinguis Régimbart, 1892
 Hydrovatus pisiformis Biström, 1997
 Hydrovatus platycornis Young, 1963
 Hydrovatus postremus Guignot, 1942
 Hydrovatus pudicus (Clark, 1863)
 Hydrovatus pulcher Gschwendtner, 1934
 Hydrovatus pumilus Sharp, 1882
 Hydrovatus punctipennis Motschulsky, 1859
 Hydrovatus pustulatus (F.E.Melsheimer, 1844)
 Hydrovatus pyrrus Guignot, 1958
 Hydrovatus rangoonensis Guignot, 1954
 Hydrovatus reclusus Guignot, 1955
 Hydrovatus regimbarti Zimmermann, 1919
 Hydrovatus reticuliceps Régimbart, 1895
 Hydrovatus rocchii Biström, 1997
 Hydrovatus rufescens Motschulsky, 1859
 Hydrovatus rufoniger (Clark, 1863)
 Hydrovatus samuelsoni Biström, 1997
 Hydrovatus sandwichensis Biström, 1995
 Hydrovatus sanfilippoi Bilardo & Rocchi, 1990
 Hydrovatus satanas Guignot, 1958
 Hydrovatus satanoides Pederzani & Rocchi, 1982
 Hydrovatus saundersi Biström, 1997
 Hydrovatus schawalleri Biström, 1997
 Hydrovatus scholaeus Guignot, 1958
 Hydrovatus seminarius Motschulsky, 1859
 Hydrovatus semirufus Zimmermann, 1924
 Hydrovatus senegalensis Régimbart, 1895
 Hydrovatus seydeli Guignot, 1953
 Hydrovatus sharpi Branden, 1885
 Hydrovatus similis Biström, 1997
 Hydrovatus simoni Régimbart, 1894
 Hydrovatus sinister Sharp, 1890
 Hydrovatus sitistus Omer-Cooper, 1963
 Hydrovatus sobrinus Omer-Cooper, 1957
 Hydrovatus soror Biström, 1997
 Hydrovatus spadix Guignot, 1948
 Hydrovatus spissicornis Régimbart, 1905
 Hydrovatus sporas Guignot, 1959
 Hydrovatus stappersi Guignot, 1959
 Hydrovatus stridulus Biström, 1997
 Hydrovatus subparallelus Gschwendtner, 1930
 Hydrovatus subrotundatus Motschulsky, 1859
 Hydrovatus subtilis Sharp, 1882
 Hydrovatus sumatrensis Sharp, 1882
 Hydrovatus suturalis Bilardo & Pederzani, 1978
 Hydrovatus testudinarius Régimbart, 1895
 Hydrovatus tristis Guignot, 1961
 Hydrovatus turbinatus Zimmermann, 1921
 Hydrovatus tydaeus Biström, 1997
 Hydrovatus uhligi Biström, 1995
 Hydrovatus unguicularis Biström, 1997
 Hydrovatus unguiculatus Biström, 1997
 Hydrovatus uniformis (Fairmaire, 1869)
 Hydrovatus validicornis Régimbart, 1895
 Hydrovatus verisae Bilardo & Rocchi, 1987
 Hydrovatus vicinus Guignot, 1958
 Hydrovatus villiersi Guignot, 1955
 Hydrovatus visendus Biström, 1997
 Hydrovatus vividus Guignot, 1954
 Hydrovatus vulneratus Biström, 1997
 Hydrovatus vulpinus Biström, 1997
 Hydrovatus weiri Biström, 1997
 Hydrovatus wewalkai Biström, 1999
 Hydrovatus wittei Biström, 1997
 Hydrovatus yagii Kitayama, Mori & Matsui, 1993
 Hydrovatus youngi Biström, 1997

References

Dytiscidae